Aeranthes ramosa is a species of orchid native to Madagascar.

ramosa
Orchids of Madagascar
Plants described in 1901